Piatra Roşie, which means Red Rock, was a Dacian hill fort two days march to the west from Costeşti-Cetăţuie fortress, at Luncani in Boşorod municipality.  It was built in two phases.  In the first phase a long (102 m) rectangular main citadel was built at the height of land with watch towers on each end and two outlying watch towers. Later the larger area inside the watch towers was enclosed with walls. It appears that the hilltop was flattened in the process in order to produce a usable space.

Artefacts

References

External links

Cetățile dacice din Munții Orăștiei - Luncani - Piatra Roșie
Virtual reconstruction of the fortress
Cetatea Luncani - Piatra Roșie

Dacian towns
Dacian fortresses of the Orăștie Mountains
Dacian fortresses in Hunedoara County
Tourist attractions in Hunedoara County
Historic monuments in Hunedoara County
Ancient history of Transylvania